is a JR West railway station located on the San'in Main Line in Yuya Igami, Nagato, Yamaguchi Prefecture, Japan.

Railway stations in Japan opened in 1930
Railway stations in Yamaguchi Prefecture
Sanin Main Line
Stations of West Japan Railway Company